Mick Taylor is the debut studio album by the former Rolling Stones guitarist Mick Taylor, released in 1979. Though the album was acclaimed by critics, it was not very commercially successful. It spent only five weeks on the Billboard Hot 200 and peaked at #119. The album's pleasant blues-based style was generally much softer than his work with the Rolling Stones. The album's polished blues- and jazz-based sound was arguably at odds with the mood of the moment of its release when punk and new wave were on the ascendancy, although fans were still buying the recordings of similar artists such as Dire Straits, Eric Clapton, Fleetwood Mac and the Rolling Stones themselves.

The opening track "Leather Jacket" was a song which originated during Taylor's days with the Rolling Stones. An instrumental track without vocals was recorded by the full band in June 1970 during the Sticky Fingers sessions, and has appeared on many bootleg records.

Track listing 
All songs written by Mick Taylor, except "Alabama", with lyrics written by Colin Allen.

Side one
"Leather Jacket" – 3:42
"Alabama" – 3:49
"Slow Blues" – 3:25
"Baby I Want You" – 5:17
"Broken Hands" – 4:00
Side two
"Giddy-Up" – 5:18
"S.W.5" – 5:37
"Spanish / A Minor" – 12:12

Personnel 
Mick Taylor – guitar and vocals (all tracks), piano (4, 7, 8a), bass guitar (4, 5, 7, 8b), electric piano (8b), synthesizer (8b), strings (7, 8a)
Richard Bailey – drums (6)
Mike Driscoll – drums (4, 5, 7, 8b), bass drum (2)
Lowell George – slide guitar (6)
Kuma Harada – bass guitar (1, 3, 8a), strings and double bass [bowed bass] (8b)
Norman Mighell – tambourine (1)
Pierre Moerlen – drums (1, 3, 8a)
Jean Roussel – piano (1, 3, 6, 8b)
Alan Spenner – bass guitar (6)
Technical
Benny King, Genaro Rippo, Guy Bidmead, Jerry Boys, John Burns, Norman Tighell, Paul Northfield, Phil Ault, Simon Fraser, Will Reid-Dick – engineer
Hipgnosis – cover design, photography

References

1979 debut albums
Columbia Records albums
Albums with cover art by Hipgnosis